The women's 100 metres hurdles at the 2006 European Athletics Championships were held at the Ullevi on August 10 and August 11.

Medalists

Schedule

Results

Round 1
Qualification: First 2 in each heat (Q) and the next 6 fastest (q) advance to the semifinals.

Semifinals
First 4 of each Semifinal will be directly qualified (Q) for the Final.

Semifinal 1

Semifinal 2

Final

External links
 Results

Hurdles 100
Sprint hurdles at the European Athletics Championships
2006 in women's athletics